The Rural Municipality of Colonsay No. 342 is a rural municipality (RM) in the Canadian province of Saskatchewan within Census Division No. 11 and  Division No. 5. it is located east of the City of Saskatoon.

History 
The RM of Colonsay No. 342 incorporated as a rural municipality on December 13, 1909.

Geography

Communities and localities 
The following urban municipalities are surrounded by the RM.

Villages
Colonsay
Meacham

The following unincorporated communities are within the RM.

Localities
 Arpiers
 Neely
 Rutan

Demographics 

Government 
The RM of Colonsay No. 342 is governed by an elected municipal council and an appointed administrator that meets on the second Wednesday of every month. The reeve of the RM is Gerald Yausie while its administrator is Randi Wood. The RM's office is located in Colonsay.

References 

C

Division No. 11, Saskatchewan